Jalgsema is a village in Järva Parish, Järva County in northern-central Estonia.

Notable births
Military commander Johan Pitka (1872–1944) was born in Jalgsema village at Terasaugu gamekeepers house.

References

 

Villages in Järva County
Kreis Jerwen